The Delano Police Department is the agency responsible for law enforcement within the City of Delano, California. The department is divided into three divisions; Administrative Division, Patrol Division, and Investigations Division. It contains approximately 80 employees, which consists of California Sworn Peace Officers and civilian employees. The Delano Police Department headquarters is located at 2330 High Street Delano, CA 93215 Kern County. The department also maintains a type 1 jail.

See also
 List of law enforcement agencies in California

References

External links
Delano Police Department

Municipal police departments of California
1913 establishments in California
Kern County, California